Yellowhawk Creek is a stream in the U.S. state of Washington.

Yellowhawk Creek was named after Chief Petumromusmus (Yellowhawk), a Cayuse leader.

See also
List of rivers of Washington

References

Rivers of Walla Walla County, Washington
Rivers of Washington (state)